The Reichenbach is a left tributary of the Kahl in the northern Spessart in Lower Franconia, Bavaria, Germany. It is 5 km (3.1 mi) long and begins at the confluence of Schützbach and Kirchengrundbach in Reichenbach. Near Mömbris the Reichenbach empties in the Kahl.

Together with Westerbach, Sommerkahl and Geiselbach, the Reichenbach is one of the largest tributaries of the Kahl.

Tributaries 
 Schützbach (left headstream)
 Kirchengrundbach (right headstream)
 Steinbach (right)
 Hohlenbach (left)
 Heimbach (left)

See also

List of rivers of Bavaria

References

Rivers of Bavaria
Rivers of Germany